The C-4 is a line and rail service of Cercanías Madrid commuter rail network, operated by Renfe Operadora. It runs from Colmenar Viejo and Alcobendas – San Sebastián de los Reyes north of Madrid to Parla south of Madrid. The C-4 shares tracks for part of its length with Madrid commuter rail service line  through the city of Madrid. The line has been in operation since 1981.

Infrastructure
Like the rest of Cercanías Madrid lines, the C-4 runs on the Iberian gauge mainline railway system, which is owned by Adif, an agency of the Spanish government. All of the railway lines carrying Rodalies de Catalunya services are electrified at 3000 volts V direct current (DC) using overhead lines. The trains on the line call at up to 18 stations, using the following railway lines, in order from north to south:

List of stations
The following table lists the name of each station served by line C-4 in order from north to south; the station's service pattern offered by C-3 trains; the transfers to other Cercanías Madrid lines; remarkable transfers to other transport systems; the municipality in which each station is located; and the fare zone each station belongs to according to the Madrid Metro fare zone system.

References

Cercanías Madrid

3000 V DC railway electrification